Ken Horn (born July 10, 1959) is an American politician from the state of Michigan. A Republican, Horn has represented the 32nd district of the Michigan Senate since 2015. He is also a former member of the Michigan House of Representatives for the 94th District (encompassing part of Saginaw County) from 2007 through 2012.

Horn first served as on the Saginaw County Board of Commissioners from the 2nd district from January 1993 to December 2006, and operated a restaurant in Frankenmuth. He was elected to the House in 2006, and re-elected in 2008 and 2010. In 2014, Horn was elected to the Senate, representing Saginaw County and the westernmost portion of Genesee County.

Horn received his bachelor's degree from Concordia University, Ann Arbor.  He is the son of immigrants from the former East Germany and resides in Frankenmuth.

References

External links
State Senator Ken Horn

1959 births
20th-century American politicians
21st-century American politicians
American people of German descent
Concordia University Ann Arbor alumni
County commissioners in Michigan
Living people
Republican Party members of the Michigan House of Representatives
Republican Party Michigan state senators
Michigan State University alumni
People from Frankenmuth, Michigan
Politicians from Detroit